White guy may refer to:
"The White Guy", a song on the 2006 album What Hell Is About
"The White Guy", a 1998 episode of Damon
Bruce Williams of Williams and Ree, an American comedy duo often billed as "The Indian and the White Guy"
That White Guy, a James Belushi sketch on Saturday Night Live in 1984–5

See also
White Boys (disambiguation)
White Man (disambiguation)
White people
Angry white male, U.S. political pejorative for a white male holding conservative or reactionary views
Sooo Many White Guys, podcast by American comedian Phoebe Robinson
"Pretty Fly (For a White Guy)", 1998 song by American band The Offspring